Enrique Llácer Soler (Alcoy, 20 June 1934), also known as Regolí, is a Spanish jazz and classical percussionist and composer.

He started his jazz career in 1952 in Barcelona's Jam Sessions while expanding his Valencia and Madrid conservatories studies under Kenny Clarke in Paris and Philly Joe Jones in New York. In 1966 he wrote a drum set method, La batería: técnica, independencia y ritmo. In 1972 he became the Spanish National Orchestra percussion soloist and he subsequently started teaching percussion in the Madrid Royal Conservatory. From then on he focused in the classical side of his career as both performer and composer, but he still was active in the Spanish jazz scene through the 1980s in bands such as Canal Street Jazz Band.

In 2015 he received the Gold Medal of Merit in the Fine Arts.

Compositions 
 Soloist and Orchestra: Percussion Concerto No. 1 — Percussion Concerto No. 2 — Castanets Concerto op.24 — Coloratura Soprano Concertino op.28 — Violin Concerto op.29 — Drum Set Concerto No. 2
 Orchestra: Welleriana op.25 — Celebration for Robinne op.26 — Fantasía en dos tiempos op.30 — Secuencias rítmicas — Fantasía rítmica
 Chamber: Divertimento for Wind Sextet
 Solo percussion: Polirritmia — Tres tiempos — Fantasy for drum set

Premieres as performer

References

1934 births
People from Alcoy
Spanish percussionists
Spanish jazz drummers
Spanish classical composers
Madrid Royal Conservatory alumni
Academic staff of the Madrid Royal Conservatory
20th-century Spanish male musicians
21st-century male musicians
Living people